Abhorrers, the name given in 1679 to the persons who expressed their abhorrence at the action of those who had signed petitions urging King Charles II of England to assemble Parliament.

Feeling against Catholics, and especially against James, Duke of York, was running strongly; the Exclusion Bill had been passed by the House of Commons, and the popularity of James Scott, 1st Duke of Monmouth, was very great.

To prevent this bill from passing into law, Charles had dissolved parliament in July 1679, and in the following October had prorogued its successor, which became known as the Exclusion Bill Parliament, without allowing it to meet.  He was then deluged with petitions urging him to call it together, and this agitation was opposed by Sir George Jeffreys and Francis Wythens, who presented addresses expressing abhorrence of the Petitioners, and thus initiated the movement of the abhorrers, who supported the action of the king. "The frolic went all over England," says Roger North; and the addresses of the Abhorrers which reached the king from all parts of the country formed a counterblast to those of the Petitioners. It is said that the terms Whig and Tory were first applied to English political parties in consequence of this dispute.

References

1679 in England
Stuart England
Political history of England